Sorbus leighensis, the Leigh Woods whitebeam, is a rare species of whitebeam, a flowering plant in the rose family.

Description
Sorbus leighensis is a small tree or shrub reaching a height of 10 m.  Like other whitebeams, the upper surface of the leaf is a light green, while the underside is white or greyish white. Leaves are obovate, and range from 7-10.5 cm long and 5–7 cm wide.

It is named after Leigh Woods in the Avon Gorge, where it is known. DNA analysis in the 2000s classified it as a triploid apomict from S. aria × S. porrigentiformis.

References

leighensis